Herrensee may refer to:

Lakes:
 Herrensee (Litschau), a lake near Litschau in the district of Gmünd in Lower Austria
 Herrensee (Strausberg), a lake near Strausberg, in the Märkisch-Oderland district, Brandenburg, Germany
 Herrensee (Waren), a lake in the town of Waren (Müritz) in Mecklenburg-Western Pomerania, Germany
 one of the Osterseen in the district of Weilheim-Schongau in Bavaria, Germany

Villages:
 a village in the municipality of Rehfelde in the district of Märkisch-Oderland in Brandenburg, Germany